Garfield Heard (born May 3, 1948) is an American retired professional basketball player and coach.  He played collegiately at the University of Oklahoma and was selected by the Seattle SuperSonics in the third round of the 1970 NBA draft. He had a 15-year NBA career for four teams (the Sonics, the Buffalo Braves/San Diego Clippers, the Chicago Bulls, and the Phoenix Suns).  Heard is best known for a buzzer beater he made to send Game 5 of the 1976 Phoenix–Boston championship series into a third overtime. This feat is commonly known as "The Cow", or "The Shot Heard 'Round the World", in reference to Ralph Waldo Emerson's poem "Concord Hymn", which was written about the Battle of Lexington.

College career
Heard set an Oklahoma school record with 21 double-doubles for a season by a Sooner in 27 games during 1969–70. It was finally broken by Blake Griffin on February 14, 2009.

Professional career
Prior to the 1973–74 NBA season, Heard and Kevin Kunnert were traded from the Chicago Bulls to the Buffalo Braves for John Hummer, a 1974 NBA draft 2nd round pick and a 1975 NBA draft 2nd round pick.  Heard went on to rank in the top ten in rebounds and blocked shots that season.  The deal was part of the resume that earned Buffalo Braves General Manager Eddie Donovan the NBA Executive of the Year Award. Heard once played 86 games in an NBA season, which is 82 games long, when he was traded in the middle of the 1975–76 NBA season from Buffalo to the Phoenix Suns.

The Shot

With two seconds remaining in double overtime, John Havlicek had given Boston a one-point advantage with a running one-handed shot. The Celtics' timekeeper then ran the clock out instead of stopping it after a made basket, per league rules. The Boston Garden crowd erupted, believing the game was over, and the Celtics themselves actually went back to their locker room. Legend has it that Havlicek had actually taken the tape off his ankles by this stage. But the Suns correctly pointed that there was still time left, though the officials only placed one second back on the clock instead of two. (Celtics fans had stormed the court after the time was erroneously allowed to expire, and one particularly boisterous fan attacked referee Richie Powers after it was announced that the game was not over yet.) Paul Westphal then intentionally took a technical foul by calling a timeout when the Suns had no more timeouts to use. It gave the Celtics a free throw, which Jo Jo White converted to give Boston a two-point edge, but the timeout also allowed Phoenix to inbound from mid-court instead of from under their own basket. When play resumed, Heard caught the inbound pass and fired a very high-arcing turnaround jump shot from at least 20 feet away. It swished through, sending the game into a third overtime. However, Boston eventually won the game and the Finals, four games to two. Heard had scored 17 points and grabbed 12 rebounds in Game 5.

A revision to Rule 12-A, Section I, in regards to excessive timeouts, resulted in the elimination of the advancement of the ball following an excessive timeout.  The rule has since been changed to award the ball to the team shooting the free throw.

Coaching
In addition to his playing career, Heard served as head coach of the Dallas Mavericks from 1993 to 1994 and the Washington Wizards from 1999 to 2000. His overall head coaching record is 23–74. During the 2004–2005 season, Heard was an assistant coach with the Detroit Pistons; he coached several games that season when Larry Brown was out due to a medical condition. Heard has also served several stints as an assistant coach for the Indiana Pacers.

Head coaching record

|-
|align="left"|Dallas
|align="left"|
| 53 || 9 || 44 ||  ||align="center"|6th in Midwest || — || — || — || —
|align="center"|Missed Playoffs
|-
|align="left"|Washington
|align="left"|
| 44 || 14 || 30 ||  ||align="center"|(fired)|| — || — || — || — 
|- class="sortbottom"
|align="left"|Career
| || 97 || 23 || 74 ||  ||align="center"| || — || — || — || — ||

References

External links
 BasketballReference.com profile as player 
 BasketballReference.com profile as coach

1948 births
Living people
African-American basketball coaches
African-American basketball players
American men's basketball players
Basketball coaches from Georgia (U.S. state)
Basketball players from Georgia (U.S. state)
Buffalo Braves players
Chicago Bulls players
Dallas Mavericks assistant coaches
Dallas Mavericks head coaches
Detroit Pistons assistant coaches
Oklahoma Sooners men's basketball players
People from Hogansville, Georgia
Phoenix Suns players
Power forwards (basketball)
San Diego Clippers players
Seattle SuperSonics draft picks
Seattle SuperSonics players
Washington Wizards head coaches
21st-century African-American people
20th-century African-American sportspeople